Liwaa Semeism is an Iraqi politician from the Sadrist Movement and minister of state for tourism and archaeology affairs and then, tourism minister in the cabinets of Nouri Maliki.

Career
A dentist by training, Semeism was appointed  minister of state for tourism and archaeology affairs to the first cabinet of Maliki in 2006. He was part of al-Sadr's bloc. He began to serve as tourism minister in the cabinet of Maliki.

Personal life
His wife is a member of the National Assembly of Iraq and related to Moqtadr al-Sadr.

References

Living people
Government ministers of Iraq
Year of birth missing (living people)